Fahrenheit is a Taiwanese Mandopop vocal quartet boy band who debut in 2005. The band consists of four members: Calvin Chen, Jiro Wang, Wu Chun, and Aaron Yan. They starred in a variety of Taiwanese dramas prior to the release of their self-titled debut album Fahrenheit.

Drama series

Movies

Notes

References

Musical group filmographies
Taiwanese filmographies